The Taiwan Semiconductor Research Institute (TSRI) is a research institute in Taiwan which was created in 2019 through the merger of the National Nano Device Laboratories and National Chip Implementation Center. It is part of the National Applied Research Laboratories under the Ministry of Science.

Overview
According to the China Times the Taiwan Semiconductor Research Institute is the "world’s only national science and technology research and development center which integrates integrated circuit design, chip offline manufacturing, and semiconductor component manufacturing process research."

History
The Taiwan Semiconductor Research Institute was created in 2019 through the merger of the National Nano Device Laboratories and National Chip Implementation Center under the National Applied Research Laboratories. TSRI was inaugurated on Jan. 30 2019 at Hsinchu Science Park.

National Chip Implementation Center
The Chip Implementation Center Establishment Project was initiated in 1992 with the National Chip Implementation Center (NCIC) being inaugurated in 1997. In 2003 it was incorporated into NARLabs. In 2007 the CIC had 106 employees with 66 being full-time researchers.

National Nano Device Laboratories
The National Nano Device Laboratories (NDL) was implemented under the National Submicron Device Laboratories Establishment Project in 1988. They began operating their first level-10 clean room in 1992. In 1993 they were renamed the National Millimicron Device Laboratories and in 2002 they were renamed the National Nano Device Laboratories. They were incorporated into NARLabs in 2003.

See also
 Industrial Technology Research Institute
 National Center for High-Performance Computing

References

2019 establishments in Taiwan
Research institutes in Taiwan
Computer science institutes